John Welles may refer to:

John Welles (died 1418), MP for Maldon
John Welles (Southwark MP), MP 1413–1431 for Southwark
John Welles (fl.1417-1433), MP for the City of London
John Welles, 1st Viscount Welles (c. 1450–1498), English Lancastrian nobleman
John Welles (MP for Windsor) (by 1485 – 1515/18), English politician

See also
John Wells (disambiguation)